Air Battle Force is a 2003 thriller novel written by Dale Brown.

Critical reception
Jeremy Magadevan of the New Straits Times described the novel as "sleep-inducing" and said that readers should "mail it to a terrorist and wait for him to die of boredom".

References

External links
 Christian Sauvé, book review, April 2006

2003 American novels
Novels by Dale Brown
American thriller novels

Aviation novels